HMS A6 was an  submarine built for the Royal Navy in the first decade of the 20th century.

Design and description
A6 was a member of the first British class of submarines, although slightly larger, faster and more heavily armed than the lead ship, . They displaced  on the surface and  submerged. The A-class submarines had a crew of 2 officers and 9 ratings.

For surface running, the boats were powered by a single 16-cylinder  Wolseley petrol engine that drove one propeller shaft. When submerged the propeller was driven by a  electric motor. They could reach  on the surface and  underwater.

The boats were armed with two 18-inch (45 cm) torpedo tubes in the bow. They could carry a pair of reload torpedoes, but generally did not as doing so that they had to compensate for their weight by an equivalent weight of fuel.

Construction and career
A6 was ordered as part of the 1903–04 Naval Programme from at Vickers. She was laid down at the shipyard in Barrow-in-Furness on 1 September 1903, launched on 3 March 1904 and completed on 23 March 1905.

A6 ran aground on a sandbank in Sandown harbour on 31 July 1906, but received little damage.

Notes

References

External links
 MaritimeQuest HMS A-6 Pages

 

A-class submarines (1903)
World War I submarines of the United Kingdom
Ships built in Barrow-in-Furness
Royal Navy ship names
1904 ships